Ian Taylor may refer to:

 Ian Taylor (musician), American musician
 Ian Taylor (Australian politician), former Australian politician and Western Australian Deputy Premier and Opposition Leader
 Ian Taylor (bowls) (born 1957), Australian international lawn and indoor bowler
 Ian Taylor (British businessman) (1956–2020), Chief Executive Officer of Vitol
 Ian Taylor (British politician) (born 1945), British Conservative Party Member of Parliament
 Ian Taylor (field hockey) (born 1954), former England field hockey player
 Ian Taylor (footballer, born 1968), English football player (Aston Villa)
 Ian Taylor (footballer, born 1948), Scottish football player (Aberdeen FC)
 Ian Taylor (New Zealand businessman) (born 1950), businessman from Dunedin, New Zealand
 Ian Taylor (sociologist) (1944–2001), British sociologist
 Ian Taylor (volleyball) (born 1977), Canadian volleyball player
 Ian David Taylor (born 1938), British Olympic hockey player